The Woman's Side is a 1922 American silent drama film directed by J.A. Barry and starring Katherine MacDonald, Edmund Burns and Henry A. Barrows.

Cast
 Katherine MacDonald as 	Mary Gray
 Edmund Burns as Theodore Van Ness Jr. 
 Henry A. Barrows as Thedore VanNess Sr. 
 T.D. Crittenden as Judge Gray 
 Ora Devereaux as The ex-Mrs. Judge Gray
 Wade Boteler as 'Big Bob' Masters

References

Bibliography
 Connelly, Robert B. The Silents: Silent Feature Films, 1910-36, Volume 40, Issue 2. December Press, 1998.
 Munden, Kenneth White. The American Film Institute Catalog of Motion Pictures Produced in the United States, Part 1. University of California Press, 1997.

External links
 
 

1922 films
1922 drama films
1920s English-language films
American silent feature films
Silent American drama films
American black-and-white films
Preferred Pictures films
1920s American films